WRCV  101.7 FM is a radio station licensed to Dixon, Illinois, covering Northern Illinois, including Dixon, Sterling, and Rock Falls. WRCV has a country music format and is owned by NRG Media. The station began broadcasting September 1, 1965, and held the call sign WIXN-FM. The station was originally owned by Russell G. Salter, and simulcast the programming of WIXN 1460.

References

External links
WRCV's website

RCV
Country radio stations in the United States
NRG Media radio stations
Radio stations established in 1965
1965 establishments in Illinois